Die Schwalbe (English: The Swallow) is the German chess composition society. It issues the bimonthly magazine Die Schwalbe.

Society 
Die Schwalbe was founded on 10 February 1924 in Essen as Vereinigung von Problemfreunden zur Förderung der Aufgabenkunst (Society of problem friends for advancement of chess composition art). There had been 15 foundation fathers from the Ruhr Area lead-managed by Wilhelm Maßmann. Anton Trilling was their first president. In 1972 Die Schwalbe became a member  of Deutscher Schachbund (German chess union) initiated by Gerhard Wolfgang Jensch.

Johannes Hinsken from Bottrop proposed the name of the society. The name traces back to a famous four-mover entitled Eine Schwalbe composed by Johannes Kohtz (1843–1918) and Carl Kockelkorn (1843–1914).  The elderly problemists, who composed Eine Schwalbe after a hiatus of some years, published the problem with the motto "Eine Schwalbe macht noch keinen Sommer." (One swallow does not make a summer.)

The solution exclusively consists of moves by the white queen, that draws their circles like a swallow (Schwalbe). 
1.Qa7? (threatens Qa1#) is refuted by Ra4!, and 1.Qh7? (threatens Qb1#) is refuted by Re4!

1.Qf7! (threatens 2.Nd3+ Kd1 3.Qb3#) Bd5
2.Qa7 (threatens Qa1#) Ra4
3.Qh7 Re4  / Be4 )
4.Qh1 mate / Qh4 mate

This problem is the earliest example in which a Grimshaw is preceded by critical moves by both Rook and Bishop.: In the third move the black rook and the black bishop mutually obstruct in the point of intersection e4. This is outstanding aesthetically, because in the preceding moves both pieces only have been directed back critically over e4 (the bishop in the first, the rook in the second move). Only after that can white exploit the point of intersection e4 during the third move.

Magazine 
The magazine Die Schwalbe appeared the first time in July 1924. Since that date it issues bimonthly. Only between 1943 and 1946 the appearance had been broken by the war. The then president of the society Wilhelm Karsch bridged that time sending all members Mitteilungen der Schwalbe (notes of the society). Die Schwalbe is worldwide recognised as a trade magazine. In the magazine chess compositions and solutions are published, composition tournaments announced and articles about chess compositions published.

References

Further reading
 Dittmann, Wolfgang. (2018). Der Flug der Schwalbe: Geschichte einer Problemschach-Vereinigung. Schwalbe, deutsche Vereinigung für Problemschach e.V. Munich. 
 The book can only be purchased at this website: dieschwalbe.de/flugderschwalbe.htm

External links
 www.dieschwalbe.de
 Chessbase: "Schwalbe" - history tour of the German chess problem society

1924 in chess
1924 establishments in Germany
Bi-monthly magazines published in Germany
Chess problems
Chess periodicals
Chess in Germany
German-language magazines
Magazines established in 1924
Magazines published in Munich
Mass media in Essen